Streptomyces asterosporus is a bacterium species from the genus Streptomyces.

See also 
 List of Streptomyces species

References

External links
Type strain of Streptomyces asterosporus at BacDive -  the Bacterial Diversity Metadatabase

asterosporus
Bacteria described in 1986